The National Association of Scholars (NAS) is an American non-profit politically conservative advocacy organization, with a particular interest in education. It opposes a perceived political correctness on college campuses and supports a return to mid-20th-century curricular and scholarship norms, and an increase in conservative representation in faculty.

History and organization

Originally called the Campus Coalition for Democracy, the National Association of Scholars was founded in 1987 by Herbert London and Stephen Balch with the goal of preserving the "Western intellectual heritage". , Peter Wyatt Wood is the president. The advisory board of the NAS has included several notable conservatives, such as Jeane Kirkpatrick, a former United States Ambassador to the United Nations and adviser to Ronald Reagan. Chester Finn helped to form the conservative movement's education policies.  According to the association, it has affiliates in 46 U.S. states, as well as in Guam and Canada.

NAS has received funding from politically conservative foundations, including the Sarah Scaife Foundation, the John M. Olin Foundation, the Bradley Foundation, the Castle Rock Foundation, the Smith Richardson Foundation, and the Arthur N. Rupe Foundation.

Positions and activities

The NAS was an early critic of political correctness, engaged the American Association of University Professors over some of its policies, and complained to the secretary of the U.S. Department of Education, Lamar Alexander, who ruled that the Middle States Association of Colleges and Schools eliminate its diversity standard.  NAS's stands have led critics to label NAS "conservative", a "group of reactionary scholars" and "a leading vehicle for the conservative attack on multiculturalism and political correctness". Jacob Weisberg stated in 1991 that NAS is "prone to conflating its admirable ideals with far less compelling political prejudices."

Chapters of the NAS have been involved in a number of campus controversies related to affirmative action and multicultural studies programs. According to People for the American Way, NAS faculty at the University of Texas, Austin blocked the inclusion of civil rights readings in an English course; the readings had been proposed to address concerns about racial and sexual harassment on campus. In 1990, the NAS placed an advertisement in the Daily Texan (the University of Texas student newspaper), calling for the rejection of a proposed multiculturalism curriculum at the University of Texas. Simultaneously, the NAS encouraged a successful campaign to defund the university's Chicano newspaper.  Time magazine in 1991 called NAS the "faculty opposition to the excesses of multiculturalism" and to "courses about race and gender issues."

In 1990, a Duke University chapter of the NAS was formed by political science professor James David Barber. The new chapter provoked "a sometimes bitter debate" about the NAS stances on race and gender, and on whether academic freedom should extend to what NAS critics viewed as intolerance.  Stanley Fish, chairman of the English department at Duke, wrote that NAS "is widely known to be racist, sexist and homophobic." In an interview with the Durham Morning Herald, Barber called Fish "an embarrassment to this university for his gross insult to this organization." In response to the NAS chapter formation, a larger group of faculty formed "Duke Faculty for Academic Tolerance".

Also in 1990, the Harvard University community debated the presence of the NAS. Writing in the Harvard Crimson, Martin L. Kilson Jr. acknowledged some "overzealous behavior by supporters of ethnic studies and women studies" but argued that the NAS was an "overkill neoconservative response." In Kilson's view, NAS had succumbed to "anxiety and maybe phobia" of multiculturalism. He asks, "why shouldn't persons on our campuses go to great lengths to avoid the tag 'racist'"? Or the tags 'homophobic', 'sexist', 'anti-Asian', etc.?" 

In 2001, it was reported that the Colorado Commission on Higher Education had paid the National Association of Scholars $25,000 to generate a report on several Colorado universities with education programs. The NAS report criticized diversity curricula and recommended that the University of Colorado's education program be suspended and new admissions to other programs be halted. University of Colorado, Boulder dean William Stanley resigned in protest of what he called "teacher-bashing" by the NAS, while regent Bob Sievers deplored "anti-teaching, anti-C.U./Boulder, anti-women and anti-minority bias." Questions were also raised regarding why money was paid to a "right-wing" organization like the NAS rather than to a group "with credentials in teacher education."

In September 2008, The New York Times described the NAS as among the politically conservative organizations intensively and successfully lobbying for federal funding for programs which emphasize "traditional American history, free institutions or Western civilization". The Times reported that NAS and allied organizations sought to advance conservative causes by attaching conditions to university donations.

In 2011 NAS launched its Center for the Study of the Curriculum to "document and to analyze important changes" to college curricula and "to propose improvements." The center conducts yearly reviews of colleges and universities' common reading programs. The annual Beach Books report identifies the colleges that have these programs, the books they assign, and patterns in the assignments.  The 2012–13 report found that 97 percent of colleges and universities chose books published in or after 1990. The most popular book assigned was The Immortal Life of Henrietta Lacks by Rebecca Skloot. Writing at The Guardian, the report's author, Ashley Thorne, criticized the lack of classics: "The choice of a recent book that is often the only book students will have in common with one another points to the death of a shared literary culture. To the extent that colleges want to approach that culture, they display willful selfishness in confining their sights to the present."

NAS president Peter Wood wrote in the Chronicle of Higher Education, "What is lamentable is the scant attention to important books, let alone classics; the relentless emphasis on the short-term and easily accessible; and the dominance of books that emphasize personal perspectives over efforts to know the world as it really is."  NAS also publishes a list of books it recommends for colleges to assign as common reading.

In January 2013 the Center for the Study of the Curriculum, along with NAS's affiliate the Texas Association of Scholars, released a report on U.S. history courses taught in the Fall 2010 semester at the University of Texas and Texas A&M University.  The report, Recasting History, examined all 85 sections of lower-division courses that satisfied a Texas statute requiring students at public institutions to take two courses in American history. NAS concluded that a preponderance of the courses emphasized social history focusing especially on race, class, or gender. Other topics such as military, diplomatic, religious, and intellectual history were taught less frequently.  After the report's release, Jeremi Suri, the Mack Brown Distinguished Professor for Global Leadership, History, and Public Policy at UT-Austin, called the report "misleading, and frankly dumb." Writing in The Alcalde, the official alumni magazine, Suri defended the University of Texas's course offerings, saying, "What we are teaching at UT, in almost all of our history and related courses, is a plural history of how many different people and parts of America relate to one another. What we are teaching is the beauty, the color, the promise, and also the challenge of contemporary America." Richard Pells, a former history professor at the University of Texas, wrote in an op-ed for the Austin-American Statesman, "I am neither conservative nor a member of the NAS. But I am an American historian who taught at UT from 1971 to 2011. And based on my own experiences at UT, I believe the report's main arguments are absolutely correct."

In April 2013, NAS released What Does Bowdoin Teach? How a Contemporary Liberal Arts College Shapes Students. The 383-page study examined Bowdoin College in Brunswick, Maine, presenting it as representative of trends in college education in the United States. The report tracked how the college's decisions over forty years affected the curriculum, academic requirements, advising, faculty hiring, faculty committees, core values, key terms, campus controversies, residence life, disciplinary codes, student government, clubs, sports, and administrative priorities. The authors criticized Bowdoin for abolishing its core curriculum in 1969 and creating the system that remains in place in which there are few general education requirements.  They also criticized Bowdoin for what they argued are overly specialized and politicized academic departments, a politically correct environment, and the college's disregard for intellectual diversity. David Feith wrote in The Wall Street Journal that the report "demonstrates how Bowdoin has become an intellectual monoculture dedicated above all to identity politics." Bowdoin College's response to the report was mixed.  Writing in the Bowdoin Sun (the college's official newspaper) Bowdoin president Barry Mills called the report "mean-spirited and personal." Bowdoin Social Sciences professor Jean Yarbrough wrote in The Bowdoin Orient, "Although I do not agree with all the findings of the NAS report, I believe that it highlights serious problems with the current state of education at Bowdoin and at elite institutions in general."

In April 2017, the NAS published Outsourced to China: Confucius Institutes and Soft Power in American Higher Education. The 187-page report detailed the Chinese Communist Party's creation and maintenance of Confucius Institutes (Chinese language and cultural centers) at hundreds of campuses across the United States, and thousands around the world. This report, along with similar work by other organizations, lead to widespread criticism of the Hanban, an agency of the Chinese Ministry of Education, and Confucius Institutes more widely. In 2018, FBI Director Christopher Wray testified to Congress on the threat China poses to American higher education, and in particular, China's attempts to influence higher education and conduct research theft and espionage. Director Wray noted that "[Confucius Institutes are] just one of the many tools they [the Chinese] take advantage of." In 2020, the Chinese Ministry of Education rebranded the Confucius Institutes, officially spinning off the program from the Hanban to a new organization: The Chinese International Education Foundation. The NAS maintains an up-to-date list of Confucius Institutes open in the U.S. Since the release of Outsourced to China, 85 Confucius Institutes have closed on American college campuses.

Academic Questions

The NAS's quarterly journal, Academic Questions, publishes articles and interviews on higher education, with a focus on examining issues that arise from the interplay among politics, ideology, scholarship, and teaching in higher education. Academic Questions describes itself as "a journal dedicated to strengthening the integrity of scholarship and teaching."

In a 1994 review in The Times Literary Supplement, Jonathan Rauch wrote that: "Though written mainly by scholars, it is a missionary journal, not a scholarly one." Rauch concluded: "If at times hectoring, Academic Questions is that rare and useful thing among journals—a live wire."

Most issues of Academic Questions focus on a particular theme in higher education. Previous themes have included "Why Study Islam, India, and China?"; "Why Study the West?"; "Hard Cases: America's Law Schools"; "Liberal Education and the Family"; and "A Crucible Moment? A Forum on the President’s Call for a New Civics".

Academic Questions has included articles by Jacques Barzun, Eugene Genovese, Thomas Sowell, and Terry Eagleton, and interviews with Tom Wolfe, Julius Lester, Napoleon Chagnon, and Joseph Morrison Skelly.

Richard Arum, Jill Biden, Andrew Delbanco, Joseph Epstein, Victor Davis Hanson, Wilfred M. McClay, Charles Murray, and Ibn Warraq were among those who contributed to Academic Questions, "One Hundred Great Ideas for Higher Education", a symposium in the journal's 100th issue published in 2012.

Notes

References

External links
 

 
Academic freedom
Conservative organizations in the United States
Education in the United States
Opposition to affirmative action
Organizations established in 1987
Organizations based in New York City
Political organizations based in the United States
1987 establishments in the United States
John M. Olin Foundation